This is a list of universities in Benin as accredited by the Ministry of Higher Education, Benin.

Public universities
List of public universities from the Ministry of Higher Education and Scientific Research of Benin:

 University of Abomey-Calavi
 University of Kétou
 University of Parakou

Private universities
 Institut Supérieur de Formation Professionnelle (ISFOP)
 Lakeside University College (LUC) Benin

 African University of Bénin
 Afriford University, Cotonou, Benin Republic
 Canadian International Education Institute, Benin Republic
 Centre International Universitaire Des Meilleurs (CIUM-Bestower International University) Seme-Podji, Cotonou 
 Ecole Superieure de Gestion et de Technologie (ESGT-Benin University)
 Ecole Superieure de Technologie et de Gestion (ESTG-Benin University)
 Ecole Superieure des Cadres Technology, (ESCT University), Benin Cotonou
 Ecole Superieure des sciences, de commerce et administration des enterprise du Benin (ESCAE-BENIN)
 Ecole Superieure Panafricaine de Management Applique  (ESPAM-FORMATION),  
 Ecotes university
 Edexcel University
 Esep le berger Université
 ESTAM University Seme Campus
 Heim Weldios University
 Houdegbe North American University, Benin
 Institut Universitaire du Bénin (IUB)
 Institut Supérieur de Communication et de Gestion(ISCG-Benin University),
 Institut Supérieur De Management Et De Technologie (ISMT St Salomon University)
 Institute Regional Superieure des beaux arts, de la culture et de la communication (IRSBACCOM UNIVERSITY)
 International university of management and administration, Benin Republic (IUMA)
 Pinnacle African University Porto Novo
 Poma University, Ayetedjou,  Ifangni 
 Protestant University of West Africa
 Université Africaine de Développement Coopératif
 Université des Sciences Appliquées et Management USAM
 Université la Hegj, Benin (Semepodji campus) 
 Universitie Polytechnique Internationale du Benin
 West African University Benin, (WAUB), Benin Republic Cotonou

References

Universities
Universities
Benin and Nigeria
Benin